Lacul Auster (Romanian for the austere lake) is a natural salt lake in the town of Ocna Sibiului, Sibiu County, Transylvania, Romania. It is one of the many lakes of the Ocna Sibiului mine, a large salt mine which has one of the largest salt reserves in Romania.

In the middle of the lake, an islet has been formed. The islet makes the lake unique among the other lakes of the mine.

Name 
In Romanian, the word auster means austere. The lake is nicknamed Lacul cu insula (lit. the Lake with the Island) because of its island, which makes it unique among the salt mine's lakes. Previously, the lake had the nickname Lacul Roșu (the Red Lake) due to its reddish color.

History 
Lacul Auster was formed on the site of an old non-documented saltworks. In 1922, its water level was much higher than at present, and it was lowered by artificial drainage because it was believed that its waters flooded the Ignaţiu salt mine, which was in operation.

Information 
Surface: 
Maximum depth: 
Salinity: 140 g/l
Fauna: Artemia salina

Lakes of the salt mine 
 Auster 
 Lake Avram Iancu-Ocniţa
 Balta cu Nămol 
 Brâncoveanu 
 Cloşca 
 Crişan
 Lacul Fără Fund 
 Gura Minei 
 Horea 
 Mâţelor 
 Negru
 Pânzelor 
 Rândunica 
 Verde (Freshwater lake)
 Vrăjitoarelor (Freshwater lake)

References

Lakes of Sibiu County